Diana Franco is a Colombian model and actress. She was born in Cali, Colombia and in 1982 moved to New York City, where she lived and studied. In 1988, in a nationwide televised competition, Franco was crowned Miss Colombia USA. Franco became a TV commercial and editorial model and in December 1990 appeared on her first cover of Cosmopolitan en Español. In Peru, La Modelo Latina Pageant 1991 awarded her La Silueta Diet-Coke title. In 1992, Franco was approached to participate in Buscando Estrellas Con Budweiser, the Spanish-version of Star Search, where -once again – won first place. Later that same year, Cover Girl Make-Up chose her to be one of the faces for their TV campaigns for the Hispanic market alongside of Barbara Palacios (Miss Universe 1986).

After traveling and working around the world, including places such as Taipei, Istanbul and Hong Kong, Franco decided to stay in the U.S. to pursue her acting career in her native language. In 1992 Salvese Quien Pueda (SQP), a weekly comedy show that aired on the Telemundo Network made her part of their regular cast. In SQP she developed and often played Vicky Bikini, a girl who always did her errands wearing only a bikini, high hills and a handbag so she would never have to make a line. Vicky Bikini soon became one of the shows most requested characters.

In 1995, Univision Network hired Franco as the female VJ for Caliente, one of its most widely seen weekend TV shows. Caliente gave Franco the opportunity to interact with her young Latino audience while traveling to exotic beaches around the world. Two years later, Franco was asked to be part of Edición Especial (Telemundo Network), which earned her the anchor star status in the Spanish market. She was also in charged of hosting most of Telemundo's specials for the network. In 1998 she landed the role of Sylvia La Rosen in Safe Harbor (Aaron Spelling) which aired in WB Network. Glamour en Español magazine recognized her with the Most Glamorous Woman Award 1998 and in 1999 People en Español places Franco as one of the “25 Most Beautiful People” along with faces such as Salma Hayek and Ricky Martin.

In 2002, Franco traveled back to her native Colombia to portray Sandra, a cocaine manufacturer in the soap opera El Precio del Silencio (Telefutura Network). In October 2006, Franco had the opportunity to be part of the very-selected cast of the short film: Marrying God (AFI) where she played Maricela, the single mother of Lola played by Ashlyn Sanchez (Crash) and Ivy played by Alexa Vega (Spy Kids). Franco has also developed the "Life Style Specialist"  title, and is often featured in US Spanish TV station across the nation.

In Pecados Ajenos, a Telemundo Studios production, Franco played Lola, the cellmate of  Natalia -played by Lorena Rojas-  and later, Oficial Joyer, in El Rostro de Analía alongside of Elizabeth Gutiérrez.

At the end of 2009, Franco was called to play Berta, a lonely bitter architect designer in the new version of Perro Amor, but due to a skiing accident, where she suffered several fractures, her role was eventually withdrawn. It took her several months to recuperate from her injuries.  
 
In 2010, Franco became part of the selected cast of the new version of the Chilean soap opera, Alguien Te Mira (2010), produced this time by Telemundo Television Studios in the USA. Franco portrays Dolores "Lola" Morandé, a housewife that has everything under control, except a couple of pounds of over weight, until she meets a very troubled woman that is determined to make her life miserable and hopes one day to take her place as the wife of her perfect husband.

Filmography

References

http://www.dianafranco.com/pb/wp_e74b9f93/wp_e74b9f93.html?0.47589622366982337
El Nuevo Herald 23 November 2006 page 4D, Miami, Florida newspaper;
La Opinion November 23, 1996, Los Angeles, CA newspaper;
Cristina La Revista Magazine
People en Español, June 1998

Year of birth missing (living people)
Living people
People from Cali